Cepharanoline is an isolate of Stephania that has antiplasmodial activity with an IC50 of 0.2 µM.

References

Benzylisoquinoline alkaloids